E. ehrenbergii may refer to:

 Echinocereus ehrenbergii, a ribbed cactus
 Euphlyctis ehrenbergii, a frog endemic to the Red Sea coast